The Calgary Zoo is located in Bridgeland, Calgary, Alberta, Canada, just east of the city's downtown and adjacent to the Inglewood and East Village neighborhoods.  It is accessible via Calgary's C-Train light rail system, by car via Memorial Drive, and by bicycle and footpath via the Bow River pathway. A large portion of the zoo is located on St. George's Island in the Bow River.

The zoo is operated by the Calgary Zoological Society, an independent not-for-profit organization that is Alberta's oldest registered charity. The AZA, WAZA, and CAZA accredited zoo was among the first in Canada to be accredited by all three associations. It is home to over 1,000 animals, excluding individual fish and insects, and 272 different species. The 120-acre zoo is organized by into seven distinct zones: Destination Africa, Canadian Wilds, Penguin Plunge, Dorothy Harvie Botanical Gardens and ENMAX Conservatory, TransAlta Rainforest, Eurasia, and Prehistoric Park. The zoo is open every day except for Christmas Day.

As Canada's most visited zoo, Calgary Zoo was in 2015 recognized by TripAdvisor with its Travellers' Choice Award. The zoo has also received international recognition as one of the top zoos in the world for conservation research. In 2013, the Association of Zoos and Aquariums said "the Calgary Zoo sets itself apart as one of the top zoos in the world." In 2015 the zoo was named one of the top three most respected organizations in Alberta and one of Alberta's 10 most beloved brands.

History
St. George's Island was Calgary's first park, used by the community for picnics, relaxing, and socializing. The first collection of animals appeared on the island in 1917. The Calgary Zoological Society was established on 9 January 1929.

Several animals died during floods in June 1929 when St. George's Island was swamped.

Destination Africa opened in 2003 to include two new facilities The TransAlta Rain Forest and the African Savannah. The zoo opened Penguin Plunge, an Arctic/Antarctic penguin addition in 2012.

In April 2013, the Calgary Zoo announced a master plan for rebuilding the zoo over 20 years. The initial focus on the master plan was preparing for the arrival of two giant pandas in 2018 for a five-year stay.

2013 flooding
The Calgary area suffered extensive flooding in June 2013 resulting in over $50 million in damage to the island section of the Calgary Zoo and parts of its Canadian Wild zone (see 2013 Alberta floods). In a 12-hour period, with flood waters rising, zoo staff managed to move 140 animals to higher ground. In the end, the only animals lost were a number of fish, two peacocks, and a pot-bellied pig. The zoo was closed for most of July 2013; the northern 60 acres of the zoo reopened to the public for August through November. The zoo fully reopened in November 2013 with new animals, exhibits, and features unveiled in 2014, including mandrills and Komodo dragons.

Conservation

One third of the zoo's 130 species are cared for within Species Survival Plans, a global initiative to protect at-risk genetic diversity. Twenty-nine species at the zoo are in danger of extinction. Other species are considered "ambassadors" for endangered species. The Calgary Zoo uses a team of educators including animal keepers, interpreters, teachers, and volunteers to increase awareness among visitors about the beauty of nature and threats to wildlife. Each year the zoo's formal programs connect directly with more than 575,000 adults and children.

The Calgary Zoo is home to a team of biologists who have earned international recognition as North America's leaders in the science of species recovery and reintroduction. The science journal Nature rates the Calgary Zoo as one of the top five zoos in the world for conservation research, alongside New York, San Diego, Frankfurt, and London. In June 2012, the head of the Calgary Zoo's Centre for Conservation Research, Dr. Axel Moehrenschlager, was awarded the Canadian Wildlife Federation's Roland Michener Conservation Award which recognizes individuals who have shown a commitment to "promote, enhance, and further the conservation of Canada's natural resources". Dr. Moehrenschlager is chair of the Reintroduction Specialist Group within the International Union for the Conservation of Nature, the world's largest conservation network. He is the first North American to hold this position.

The zoo focused on saving eight highly endangered Western Canada species: whooping crane, Vancouver Island marmot, swift fox, black-footed ferret, black-tailed prairie dog, burrowing owl, northern leopard frog and greater sage grouse. It also works on conservation projects around the world, including:
 Wechiau Community Hippo Sanctuary, Ghana
 Snow leopards in Central Asia, and
 Gorillas in the Democratic Republic of Congo

In 2008, the zoo's Wechiau Community Hippo Sanctuary project, a collaboration involving 17 Ghana villages, was awarded the United Nations Equator Prize as one of the world's top 25 conservation initiatives. It has become a model for community-based conservation throughout Africa.

Destinations

Overview
The Calgary zoo has many different exhibits in its 92 acres of land.

Destination Africa

Opened in 2003, the Destination Africa project was among the zoo's most ambitious expansions.  The complex of four buildings includes the TransAlta Rainforest and the African Savannah. The TransAlta Rainforest occupies 2,900 square metres (31,000 square feet) and features a collection of African rainforest flora and fauna. The African Savannah building is home to hippos, Masai giraffes, red river hogs, and a baobab tree. A 340,000-litre (80,000-gallon) indoor pool for hippos offers view of the creatures underwater. In the warmer months, the doors lift to connect the building with the rest of the Savannah exhibit, home to Hartmann's mountain zebras, grey crowned cranes and ostriches. Many other animals of the grasslands, including African lions, also reside in the Savannah exhibit. In the TransAlta Rainforest, there are primates such as western lowland gorillas, eastern black-and-white colobus, and mandrills, and a number of reptiles including leopard tortoises,   Malagasy tree boas, a panther chameleon and a pair of dwarf crocodiles, as well as an aviary containing various species of African birds.

Land Of Lemurs
In 2017, the Land of Lemurs was opened to the public, with 3 different species of lemurs residing within; the black-and-white ruffed lemur, the ring-tailed lemur, and the red-fronted lemur.

Canadian Wilds

The Canadian Wilds were built in the 1990s to house the majority of zoo's collection of North American birds and mammals. The area includes outdoor enclosures in three zones: the Aspen Woodlands, the Northern Forest, and the Rocky Mountains. Animals in the enclosures include dall sheep, river otters, caribou, bighorn sheep, mountain goats, grizzly bears, muskoxen, whooping cranes, black bears, cougars, wood bison, and grey wolves.

Rocky Mountain Bird Aviary
This aviary includes a barred owl, golden eagle, great grey owl, bald eagle, snowy owl, and rough-legged hawk.

Dorothy Harvie Botanical Gardens and ENMAX Conservatory
The outdoor gardens are among the zoo's most popular attractions and include the Dorothy Harvie Gardens. The zoo's sheltered location supports many marginally hardy plant species. The conservatory comprises the indoor component of the zoo's gardens. It includes a number of "themed" areas such as the tropical garden, the rainforest, the arid garden, and the butterfly garden. A number of animals including birds and invertebrates are housed in the conservatory. The ENMAX Conservatory was completely renovated in 2009 and features an increased emphasis on teaching visitors the importance of plants and improving energy efficiency. The Calgary Zoo achieved LEED (Leadership in Energy and Environmental Design) Gold in energy conservation and responsible building practices, the first facility of its kind to achieve this level of certification.

Exploration Asia (Formerly Eurasia)

The western portion of St. George's Island is dedicated to Eurasian animals. Animals in this area include Amur tigers, snow leopards, Pallas's cats, Japanese macaques, red pandas, Japanese serows, Bactrian camels, and Komodo dragons. This section was also home to four giant pandas which debuted in early May 2018. The giant pandas were on loan from the Chengdu Research Base in Chengdu, Sichaun, China. Panda Passage featured adult male Da Mao, cubs Jia Yueyue and Jia Panpan as well as their mother Er Shun. Since then, the pandas have been returned to China because of bamboo supply chain issues arising from CoVID-19.  Formerly residing in the Panda's habitat area was a herd of Asian elephants (relocated to the Smithsonian National Zoo) and later a male Indian rhinoceros named Sabari (now residing in Safari Niagara, Ontario). The area known as Panda Passage has since been renamed to Gateway to Asia and has seen the addition of a Malayan tapir and 2 white-handed gibbons.

Prehistoric Park

The Calgary Zoo's six-acre Prehistoric Park features life-sized dinosaurs in their re-created geographical environment, including replicas of an inland sea and volcanic mountain, and more than 100 species of living plants. Dinosaurs include Albertosaurus, Allosaurus, Ankylosaurus, Apatosaurus, Baryonyx, Centrosaurus, Corythosaurus, Deinonychus, Dilophosaurus, Edmontosaurus, Elasmosaurus, Euoplocephalus, Iguanodon, Metriacanthosaurus, Nothosaurus, Omeisaurus, Pachyrhinosaurus, Parasaurolophus, Protoceratops, Pteranodon, Pterosaur, Stegosaurus, Struthiomimus, Styracosaurus, Tanystropheus, Triceratops, Tylosaurus, Tyrannosaurus rex, and Yangchuanosaurus.

Penguin Plunge
Penguin Plunge and a renovated gift shop were opened in the spring of 2012 and is located at the entrance of the Calgary Zoo. The exhibit includes king penguins, Humboldt penguins, gentoo penguins, and rockhopper penguins . Penguin Plunge consists of two main areas, an indoor climate-controlled habitat and an outdoor open-air habitat. In summer, the outdoor exhibit holds the warm-weather South American Humboldt penguins which are housed inside during the winter. On winter days when the temperature is between +5 °C and -25 °C without wind above 20 km/h, the king penguins go on scheduled walks for exercise and enrichment.

Other/Former Animals
The zoo contains a flock of Chilean flamingos next to the enclosure containing both a herd of alpacas and greater rheas. Prior to the 2013 flooding, the zoo also had an area section dedicated to South American animals such as giant anteaters, red-bellied piranhas and various New World monkeys, as well as a number of birds including several species of macaw and two Andean condors.

There also used to be an Australian animal portion, notorious for the Creatures of the Night exhibit, mostly consisting of various nocturnal animals such as bats. Also present were a number of kangaroos, emus, monitor lizards, and for a brief temporary time, koalas.

Indian peafowl are allowed to venture around openly and freely across the zoo grounds, and are taken to an off-site facility for the winter months.

Events
Zoolights
Zoolights is a Christmas lights festival held annually at the Calgary Zoo. It closes only on Christmas Day. The month-long, animal-themed show features more than one million lights and is the largest seasonal light show in western Canada.

Recent controversy
Following a series of high-profile incidents in 2008 and 2009, some commentators criticized the zoo's conduct and operations.

Past incidents cited included:
 In January 2009, a two-year-old male Turkmenian markhor died after becoming entangled in an exhibit's play toy.
 In 2009, a knife was accidentally left in the western lowland gorilla enclosure. 
 In September 2010, Calgary Zoo staff announced the overnight death of a second tiger cub born earlier in the week to a Siberian tiger. Zookeepers were not aware that Katja, the 10-year-old mother, was expecting, saying it is hard to detect pregnancy in tigers.  Katja did not nurse her young. Zoo staff noticed her carrying the first kitten in her mouth, which is likely how it died. The zoo's veterinary team says both Siberian tiger cubs suffered similar head trauma.
 On 5 December 2009, an 18-month-old female capybara died after being crushed by a hydraulic door. A worker did not follow a long-standing procedure in operating the door.

The zoo's director said all the incidents are unrelated. An independent review was solicited by the zoo in December 2009 and was conducted by the Canadian Association of Zoos and Aquariums.  The report, released in 2010, spotlighted systemic problems. In response, the zoo developed a 36-point plan that included improving animal care procedures and collection planning, addressing staffing issues like training and structure, enhancing security systems and safety drills, and upgrading aging zoo infrastructure. Later that year, the zoo hired noted animal welfare specialist, Dr. Jake Veasey, who has since instituted major changes and spearheaded new investment in animal facilities.

Additional incidents and animal deaths also include:

 In September 2014, a problem with an ozone sensor in the hippopotamus pool is blamed for the deaths of 85 tilapia. 
 In October 2011, a zookeeper resigns following the death of a corn snake, as the keeper had left it unattended near a heat source.
 In February 2016, an otter drowned after becoming tangled in pants given to it by a zookeeper.
 In December 2016, seven Humboldt penguins died, drowning in a holding pool.

Recent notable animal births
In March 2012, Amur tiger Katja gave birth to three Amur tiger cubs at the zoo. The species is so highly endangered (there are an estimated 350 individuals worldwide), the births represented a 1% jump in the global population. In 2014, it became necessary to separate Vasili and Samkha, the two male tiger cubs, now almost full grown, from sister Kira and mom Katja (12 years old). Based on the Species Survival Plan recommendation, which manages genetics for future breeding, they were moved to Assiniboine Park Zoo in Winnipeg. In May 2018 Vasili was moved to Toronto Zoo in Toronto.

In early 2016, a western lowland gorilla infant was born to Kioja. Named Kimani, she was underweight at birth, but quickly recovered and is currently in perfect health.

In August 2016 a king penguin chick named Edward hatched, born to mother Grace. The following year another king penguin chick hatched and was named Cleopatra to follow a theme of royal names.

In May 2017 a Przewalski's horse foal was born at the Calgary Zoo's Wildlife Conservation Centre. While not visible to the public, this is an important addition to the genetic diversity of the endangered wild horse.

In June 2018 a bactrian camel calf was born to Eva. He was later named Gobi.

References

External links

 Calgary Zoo

Culture of Calgary
Zoos in Alberta
Tourist attractions in Calgary
Zoos established in 1929
1929 establishments in Alberta